Hackpen White Horse is a chalk hill figure of a white horse on Hackpen Hill, located below The Ridgeway on the edge of the Marlborough Downs, two miles south east of Broad Hinton, Wiltshire, England. It is one of nine white horse hill figures located in Wiltshire. It is also known as the Broad Hinton White Horse due to its near location to Broad Hinton. The horse is regularly scoured and maintained.

Origins and early history

The origin of the horse is uncertain, and is sometimes said to be the only 19th century white horse to have little of its history known. It is generally regarded that the horse was cut in 1838 by Henry Eatwell, a parish clerk of Broad Hinton, assisted by a local pub landlord. It is said to commemorate the coronation of Queen Victoria.

Description and location
Although Hackpen Hill is high, it is a gentle slope, especially when compared to the hills of most other Wiltshire horses. Because the hill is gentle, the horse is partly banked up and slightly raised from the surrounding grass to make it more easily visible. The head was initially elevated to help with the foreshortening. The best view of the horse is said to be from the nearby B4041 road, whilst the A361 road near Broad Hinton also provides a clear view.

At the top of the hill is a car park where the Ridgeway crosses the B4041 road, and a footpath stretches from there down to the horse, making the horse accessible to the public. Ironically, many real horses often roam the field. It has been suggested that the stones for Stonehenge and Avebury may have come from a field of sarsen stones just to the south east of its location. The expression "as different as chalk and cheese" is sometimes believed to refer to the land divided by Hackpen Hill. The hill forms the boundary between the high chalk downs to the south of it and the clay cattle country to the north, where cheese is a product of the milk from the cattle, so the two areas "are as different as chalk and cheese." Hackpen White Horse was not the only hillside shape cut to commemorate Queen Victoria; in 1887, for her Golden Jubilee, a hillside row of trees were planted in the shape of a "V" in Westmeston, Sussex.

The horse ties "neck-and-neck" with Broad Town White Horse as the closest white horse to Swindon.

Scouring and recent history

The horse is regularly scoured (cleaned and maintained). In either May or June 2000, John Wain cleaned it single-handedly, taking him some five hours. He later flew David Brewer over the area to photograph the village of Broad Hinton and the white horse for brewers's book Images of a Wiltshire Downland Village: Broad Hinton and Uffcott. Wain cleaned it annually until Bevan Pope cleaned the horse single-handedly on 23 September 2004. Wain cleaned the horse again with the help of a group of friends on 1 February 2011 and 4 February 2012. On both occasions, they illuminated the newly cleaned horse when the work was completed. Although to illuminate a white horse has been sporadic tradition for other horses in Wiltshire, those occasions marked the first times it had been done for Hackpen White Horse.

In March 2009, the horse was transformed into a "red horse" for the Comic Relief charity's Red Nose Day campaign; this was achieved by covering the horse's shape with numerous red sheets and fabrics. The White Horse pub, located half a mile away in Winterbourne Bassett, features an illustration resembling the horse as its logo. The pub itself was named after the eight horses in Wiltshire.

The horse has also featured in several artworks, including a stained glass window made by Berry Stained Glass, Benoit Philppe's The Hackpen White Horse oil on canvas painting, and a silver necklace created in 2015 by Devizes-based jeweller Daniel Pike. In 2005, the horse appeared in episode 1 of series 6 of Top Gear, and, in 2012, for a Pukka Pies sponsorship advert for ITV travel series Ade in Britain, Pukka Pies modified a photograph of the location to include a hill figure of one of their pies instead of the horse.

See also
Wiltshire white horses
Westbury White Horse
Pewsey White Horse
Devizes White Horse
Broad Town White Horse
Cherhill White Horse
Marlborough White Horse
Alton Barnes White Horse
Other white horses
Uffington White Horse
Osmington White Horse
Kilburn White Horse
Woolbury White Horse
Litlington White Horse

References

White horses (hill figures) in England
History of Wiltshire
1838 works
Monuments and memorials to Queen Victoria